This is a list of people to manage Partick Thistle Football Club since their formation in 1876.

As of July 2013, the club have had 25 permanent managers, including joint managers. John Lambie has managed the club on the most occasions, leading the club four times.

Managers

Caretaker managers

Notes

References

Managers
 
Partick Thistle
Managers